Robert James Nicholl Streeten  (born 28 June 1800, London – 10 May 1849, Worcester) was a British physician and medical editor and secretary of the Provincial Medical and Surgical Association.

The eldest of eight (or perhaps nine) children of John Mitchell Streeten and Maria Streeten (née Crane), Robert J. N. Streeten was educated at home until he matriculated at the University of Edinburgh in 1820. After studying there until 1822, Robert Streeten studied in Paris in 1822–1823 and returned in 1823 to Edinburgh, graduating in 1824 M.D. Edin. with doctoral thesis De delirio tremente. At Edinburgh he became clinical clerk to the physician and botanist Robert Graham (whom he accompanied on a walking tour to the Highlands). Soon after taking his degree, Streeten was appointed a physician to the Worcester Royal Infirmary and was soon elected a member of "Physicians to the Dispensary" (i.e. Fellow of the Royal Public Dispensary of Edinburgh). In 1836 he became a member of the Botanical Society of Edinburgh. In 1846 he became a Fellow of the Linnean Society of London.

Streeten was the editor-in-chief of the Provincial Medical and Surgical Journal from 1844 until his death in 1849. 
 Provincial Medical and Surgical Journal, 1844

Family life
In Worcestershire on 16 November 1829, Robert Streeten married Emily Sherwood (1811–1833), a daughter of the author Mary  Martha Sherwood. With her mother at her bedside, Emily Sherwood Streeten died on 8 October 1833.

Selected publications
 with A. W. Davis: "On the Misseltoe." The Analyst: a quarterly journal of science, literature, natural history, and the fine arts, no. 6 (1835): 381–387.
 "On the Progressive Development of the Vegetable Organization." The Analyst: a quarterly journal of science, literature, natural history, and the fine arts, vol. 2, no. 11 (1835): 287–300.

References

1800 births
1849 deaths
19th-century British medical doctors
Medical journal editors
English medical writers
Alumni of the University of Edinburgh